Yunisleidy "Yunis" Camejo Rodríguez (born 15 February 1990) is a Cuban handball player for BM Aula Cultural and the Cuban national team.

She competed at the 2015 World Women's Handball Championship in Denmark.

References

External links

1990 births
Living people
Cuban female handball players
Expatriate handball players
Cuban expatriate sportspeople in Spain
People from Pinar del Río
Central American and Caribbean Games bronze medalists for Cuba
Competitors at the 2018 Central American and Caribbean Games
Handball players at the 2015 Pan American Games
Handball players at the 2019 Pan American Games
Pan American Games medalists in handball
Pan American Games bronze medalists for Cuba
Central American and Caribbean Games medalists in handball
Medalists at the 2019 Pan American Games